is a railway station located in Nakama, Fukuoka.

Lines 

Chikuhō Electric Railroad
Chikuhō Electric Railroad Line

Platforms

Adjacent stations

Surrounding area
 Nishitetsu store
 Nakamahigashi Elementary School
 Nakama City Office
 Sōsha-gū Shrine
 Mos Burger Nakama 
 UNIQLO
 Yellow Hat
 Tsutaya

Railway stations in Fukuoka Prefecture
Railway stations in Japan opened in 1956